David Hill is a British political adviser who served as Alastair Campbell's replacement as Director of Communications for Tony Blair, from 2003 to 2007.

Early life 
A native of Birmingham, Hill was educated at King Edward's School and studied at Brasenose College, Oxford.

Career 
Hill returned to Birmingham as an industrial relations officer for Unigate after studying at Oxford. He later worked for Roy Hattersley and contested the Burton constituency unsuccessfully as a Labour party candidate in both of the 1974 general elections.

Hill was the Labour Party's Director of Communications from 1991 to 1997. He became Director of Communications under Prime Minister Tony Blair in 2003. Blair sought assurances from Hill after expecting onslaught after the Iraq War. After leaving Downing Street in 2007, Hill worked for Bell Pottinger.

Personal life 
Hill's long-term partner is Hilary Coffman, a press officer at Downing Street.

References

Living people
British political consultants
British special advisers
Year of birth missing (living people)
Alumni of Brasenose College, Oxford
People from Birmingham, West Midlands
Labour Party (UK) people
Labour Party (UK) officials
People educated at King Edward's School, Birmingham